Clifford Martin Will (born 1946) is a Canadian-born theoretical physicist noted for his contributions to general relativity.

Life and work 
Will was born in Hamilton, Ontario. In 1968, he earned a B.Sc. from McMaster University. At Caltech, he studied under Kip Thorne, earning his Ph.D. in 1971. He has taught at the University of Chicago and Stanford University, and in 1981 joined the faculty of Washington University in St. Louis. In 2012, he moved to a faculty position at the University of Florida.

Will's theoretical work has centered on post-Newtonian expansions of approximate solutions to the Einstein field equation, a notoriously difficult area which forms the theoretical underpinnings essential for such achievements as the indirect verification by Russell Hulse and Joseph Taylor of the existence of gravitational radiation from observations of a binary pulsar.

Will's book reviewing experimental tests of general relativity is widely regarded as the essential resource for research in this area; his popular book on the same subject was listed by The New York Times as one of the 200 best books published in 1986.

Will was a Guggenheim Fellow for the academic year 1996–1997.  From 2009 to 2018, Will was the editor-in-chief of IOP Publishing's journal Classical and Quantum Gravity.

Honors and awards
He was elected  a Fellow of the American Physical Society in 1989   and elected to the National Academy of Sciences in 2007.

In 2019, Will received the Albert Einstein Medal, awarded each year since 1979 by the Albert Einstein Society in Bern, Switzerland, for his "important contributions to General Relativity, in particular including the Post-Newtonian expansions of approximate solutions of the Einstein field equations and their confrontation with experiments."

Bibliographic information 

According to the NASA ADS database, the h-index of Professor Will is 57.

Selected works 
 
 
  (original publication date 1986)

References

External links
 
 Clifford Will Interview: Black holes – the (w)hole story
Publications of Clifford Martin Will in the database SPIRES
arXiv.org preprints for C. Will
search on author Clifford Will from Google Scholar

1946 births
Living people
21st-century American physicists
Canadian physicists
American relativity theorists
People from Hamilton, Ontario
McMaster University alumni
California Institute of Technology alumni
Stanford University faculty
Washington University in St. Louis faculty
Physicists from Missouri
Members of the United States National Academy of Sciences
Mathematical physicists
Sloan Research Fellows
Washington University physicists
Albert Einstein Medal recipients
Fellows of the American Physical Society
University of Florida faculty